J Shed is a building and collection of artists studios at Arthur Head Reserve, Fremantle. It was built as a warehouse for Fremantle Harbour in the early 20th century, and moved to its present site in the early 1960s.

See also 
 Fremantle Passenger Terminal (comprising "F" and "G" Sheds)
 E Shed Markets

References 

Fremantle Harbour
Buildings and structures in Fremantle